The 6th CC.NN. Division "Tevere" was an Italian CC.NN. (Blackshirts militia) division raised on 7 August June 1935 for the Second Italo-Ethiopian War against Ethiopia and disbanded after the war. The division was named for the Tiber river. The division had only limited combat value due to the age (World War I veterans), the physical disabilities (amputated veterans), and the lack of military training (Italians living abroad) of its troops, and the lack of machine guns and pack artillery. Nevertheless, it saw some combat in minor skirmishes on the Somali front, and performed creditably under the command of Generale di Divisione Enrico Boscardi.

Organization 
Below follows the division's organization during the Second Italo-Ethiopian War.

 6th CC.NN. Division "Tevere"
 219th CC.NN. Legion "Vittorio Veneto" (World War I veterans)
 CCXIX CC.NN. Battalion
 CCCXIX CC.NN. Battalion
 220th CC.NN. Legion
 CCI CC.NN. Battalion (World War I invalids)
 CCXX CC.NN. Battalion (World War I Arditi)
 221st CC.NN. Legion (Italians living abroad)
 CCXXI CC.NN. Battalion
 CDXXI CC.NN. Battalion
 321st CC.NN. Legion (Italians living abroad)
 CCCXXI CC.NN. Battalion
 DXXI CC.NN. Battalion
 VI CC.NN. Machine Gun Battalion "Curtatone e Montanara" (University students)
 VI Artillery Group (65/17 field guns, Royal Italian Army unit)
 VI Mixed Transport Unit (Royal Italian Army unit)
 VI Supply Unit (Royal Italian Army unit)
 VI CC.NN. Replacements Battalion
 6th Special Engineer Company (mixed CC.NN. and Royal Italian Army unit)
 6th Medical Section (Royal Italian Army unit)
 6th Logistic Section (Royal Italian Army unit)
 6th Carabinieri Section

The supply unit had 1,600 mules and the mixed transport unit 80 light trucks. The division engaged in war crimes in Ethiopia during the Second Italo-Ethiopian War.

References

Sources 
 Ettore Lucas and Giorgio de Vecchi, "Storia delle Unità Combattenti della MVSN 1923-1943", Giovanni Volpe Editore, 1976. pages 63 to 116 plus errata.

Black
Divisions of Italy of the Second Italo-Ethiopian War